Fardisya was a Palestinian Arab hamlet in the Tulkarm Subdistrict,  south of Tulkarm. 

It was depopulated during the 1947–48 Civil War in Mandatory Palestine on April 1, 1948, under Operation Coastal Clearing, and was mostly destroyed with the exception of a single deserted house.

Today the area where the village stood been subsumed into the Arab-Israeli town of Tayibe.

History
Achaelological excavations have recovered ceramics from the  Iron Age (c. tenth century BCE), and a sarcophagus from the Roman era.

The Crusaders referred to Fardisya as Phardesi.  In 1207–08 the Hospitallers received from Lady Juliana of Caesarea the villages of Pharaon (Far´un) and Seingibis (Khirbat Nisf Jubail); Phardesi  marked the southern boundary of these lands.

In 1265, Fardisya was among the villages and estates sultan Baibars allocated to his emirs after he had expelled the Crusaders, with the whole of Fardisya  given to his emir Saif al-Din Baidaghan al-Rukni.

Potsherds from the  Mamluk era have also been found here.

Ottoman era
Fardisa   was incorporated into the Ottoman Empire in 1517 with all of Palestine, and in 1596 it appeared in the  tax registers as being in the Nahiya of Bani Sa'b  of the Liwa of Nablus.  It had a population of 83, (13 households and 2  bachelors), all Muslim. The villagers paid  a fixed tax-rate of 33% various agricultural products, including wheat, barley, summer crops, olive trees,  goats and/or beehives in addition to occasional revenues; a total of  5,000  akçe. All the revenues went to a  waqf.

In 1838, Furdisia was noted as a village in the Beni Sa'ab area, west of Nablus. In 1870, Victor Guérin noted that  the village  was situated on a hill. In 1881, the PEF's Survey of Western Palestine (SWP)  described "a  small village  near the edge of the hills, remarkable only from a palm growing at it.”

British Mandate era
In the 1922 census of Palestine there were 15 villagers, all Muslim,  increasing in the 1931 census to 55 Muslims, in a total of  14  houses.

In the 1945 statistics, Fardisiya  had a population of 20 Muslims  with a total of 1,092  dunums  of land.  Of this, a total of 187  dunams were plantations and irrigated land, 388 dunums were for cereals, while 19 dunams were classified as  “built-up” areas.

1948, aftermath
The moshav Sha'ar Efraim is close to some of Fardisya's lands.

References

Bibliography

External links
Welcome To Fardisya
Fardisya,   Zochrot
Survey of Western Palestine, Map 11:    IAA, Wikimedia commons

Arab villages depopulated during the 1948 Arab–Israeli War
District of Tulkarm